Willowbank may refer to:

School of Restoration Arts at Willowbank, a school and centre for conservation studies, Canada
Willowbank Estate, a mansion in Ontario, Canada
Willowbank Wildlife Reserve, a wildlife park in Christchurch, New Zealand
Willowbank, Queensland, a suburb of Ipswich in the state of Queensland, Australia
Willowbank Raceway, at Willowbank, Queensland
Willowbank (album), a 2017 album by Yumi Zouma